The adjective Mazovian (or Masovian) may refer to:

Mazovia, a historic, geographical and cultural region of Poland
Masovians, an ethnic group in Poland
Masovian dialect, the dialect of Polish spoken in Mazovia
Masovian (European Parliament constituency)
Masovian Voivodeship, an administrative region of present-day Poland, centred on Warsaw
Masovian Voivodeship (1526–1795)

See also
 Mazowiecki (disambiguation)